She with a Broom, He in a Black Hat is a Soviet 1987 musical film, directed by Vitaly Makarov.

Plot
Unsuccessful writer-storyteller Afanasy Zyablik is not able to write a single fairy tale. He can only muster enough energy to write a title. A gust of wind scatters the sheets with names of fairy tales, and the page with the title "I'll Buy a Magic Lamp" appears in the hands of Baba Yaga's daughter in real life. Baba Yaga's daughter runs away from her native forest, taking with her the very same magic lamp that the son of Koshchei the Immortal wanted to possess, to the modern house where Zyablikov's apartment is. She gifts Afanasy a magic hat to help him write his tales and later falls in love with their neighbor the young doctor Alexey.

Cast 
Mikhail Svetin as Afanasy Zyablik, writer-storyteller
Nina Ruslanova as Vasilisa, wife of the writer-storyteller
Andrei Sokolov as Alexey Orlov, young doctor
Mikhail Kononov as The Wizard
Alexei Ostrovsky as Yura, brother of Orlov
Vladimir Presnyakov Jr. as Igor
Maria Selyanskaya as daughter of Baba Yaga
Alexander Frish as young Koschei
Yevgeny Yevstigneyev as Raven (dubbing)

Music

Soundtrack 
"The Song of the Unclean Power" (When the forest melts and the cold witch-moon reigns in the sky)
"Song of the young Koshchey" (Everything will be as I want)
"Jinn"
"The Song of the Daughter of Baba Yaga" (All Tryn-Grass)
"Everything is impossible possible"
"The Song of the Daughter of Baba Yaga" (Look, my dear lady)
"We are so stubborn there"
"Black Raven in the Sky"
"The world begins with hope"

Playback singers 
Alexey Glyzin
Vladimir Presnyakov Jr.
Oksana Shabina
Nikolai Noskov

Production
For Andrei Sokolov this was the first film in his career. He got the role by chance: he came with his actress friend to the studio and while he waited for her he walked around. He was noticed by the director Vitaliy Makarov and got the offer to star in the film.

References

External links 

1987 romantic comedy films
1987 films
1980s musical comedy films
Films scored by Aleksandr Zatsepin
Gorky Film Studio films
Russian musical comedy films
1980s Russian-language films
Soviet musical comedy films